Gordon’s functional health patterns is a method devised by Marjory Gordon to be used by nurses in the nursing process to provide a more comprehensive nursing assessment of the patient.

The following areas are assessed through questions asked by the nurse and medical examinations to provide an overview of the individual's health status and health practices that are used to reach the current level of health or wellness.
Health Perception and Management
Nutritional metabolic
Elimination-excretion patterns and problems need to be evaluated (constipation, incontinence, diarrhea)
Activity exercise-whether one is able to do daily activities normally without any problem, self care activities
Sleep rest-do they have hypersomnia, insomnia, do they have normal sleeping patterns
Cognitive-perceptual-assessment of neurological function is done to assess, check the person's ability to comprehend information
Self perception/self concept
Role relationship-This pattern should only be used if it is appropriate for the patient's age and specific situation.
Sexuality reproductive
Coping-stress tolerance
Value-Belief Pattern

References

Further reading
 Marjory Gordon. Manual of Nursing Diagnosis - Eleventh Edition. .

Nursing theory